"Feels Like Summer", also known as "42.26", is a song by American recording artist Childish Gambino. The song was released by Wolf+Rothstein, Liberator Music and RCA Records on July 11, 2018. It was written and produced by Gambino and his longtime collaborator Ludwig Göransson. The song was made available for digital download and streaming along with "Summertime Magic" as a part of the extended play Summer Pack. It is featured on the FIFA 19 soundtrack. It later appeared on his fourth album, 3.15.20, under the title "42.26". The song received a Grammy nomination for Best R&B Song at the 61st Annual Grammy Awards.

Music video
A music video for "Feels Like Summer" was released on September 1, 2018. It was directed by Glover, Ivan Dixon and Greg Sharp. In the animated video, Gambino walks calmly through a neighborhood watching all of his neighbors playing during the summer as well as stopping to have dream sequences. The neighbors are all famous rappers or modern black figures that consist of (in order and group):
 Lil Pump and Trippie Redd running around the neighborhood
 21 Savage and Metro Boomin relaxing in a car
 Kodak Black sticking his head out of the window to turn away Pump and Redd
 Migos playing basketball
 Birdman grilling while Chance the Rapper watches Jaden Smith playing
 Will Smith washing his car while Azealia Banks sits above him in a tree
 Nicki Minaj playing with blocks as Travis Scott knocks them over
 The Weeknd, Ty Dolla $ign and YG playing tug of war against ASAP Rocky, Solange and Willow Smith
 Soulja Boy speaking with Pump and Redd
 Future riding away on a bike from Drake, who chases after him
 Kid Cudi standing silent and dejected
 Kanye West, crying while wearing a Make America Great Again hat, and being comforted by Michelle Obama
 Beyoncé wearing a shirt paying tribute to Fredo Santana
 Andrew Gillum with a melting cup of ice cream representing XXXTentacion
 Lil Uzi Vert and Zendaya having their hair done by Oprah Winfrey and Tiffany Haddish
 Lil Yachty and Charlamagne Tha God eating popsicles
 Gucci Mane lying on his back relaxing
 Dr. Dre, Sean Combs, Snoop Dogg, Wiz Khalifa and Jay-Z dancing next to Mane
 Lonzo, LiAngelo and LaMelo Ball playing a video game while Young Thug does the same behind them
 2 Chainz taking a group shot of Meek Mill, Pusha T and Lil Wayne
 Rae Sremmurd blasting water guns at the past three and J. Cole
 Janelle Monáe and SZA skateboarding
 Chris Brown crying
 Outkast (Big Boi and André 3000) facing away from each other, possibly representing their breakup
 Rihanna floating in a crossed leg pose
 Whitney Houston (So Emotional single cover, 1987)
 Michael Jackson (circa the 1970s)
The large amount of celebrities featured in the music video is juxtaposed against the environmentally-focused lyrics of the song, a contrast seen by some as deliberate; the video distracts from the song, in similar fashion to how some are so focused on celebrities and their personal lives that they forget more pressing issues in the world, such as climate change. This is not too dissimilar from the music video to Gambino's earlier 2018 hit, ‘This Is America’, where Gambino and a crew of backup dancers perform distracting, choreographed dances while the background of the video and lyrics to the song are loaded with political commentary and carnage.

A follow-up video shows the animated Gambino walking into his house (which seems to partially resemble, or at least invoke, Mister Rogers' Neighborhood) and taking off his shoes to a new pair of Adidas. This was used to announce Glover's role as an ambassador and "brand co-creator" for the corporation.

Covers
French musician Sébastien Tellier released a cover of "Feels Like Summer" on July 2, 2020, exclusively for the French streaming service Deezer.

Personnel
Credits adapted from Tidal.
 Donald Glover – production, mix engineering
 Ludwig Göransson – production
 Riley Mackin – mix engineering, master engineering, record engineering
 Justin Richburg - character design, animation
Felix Colgrave - production, animation
 Jessica Maffia - single art

Charts

Certifications

Release history

References

External links

2018 singles
2018 songs
Donald Glover songs
RCA Records singles
Songs about climate change
Songs written by Donald Glover
Songs written by Ludwig Göransson
Animated music videos